Arapito is a town in the Karamea area of New Zealand. Arapito is a farming community on the south side of the Karamea River, and upriver from the main Karamea township.

The settlement was originally named Promised Land; it was changed to Arapito (Māori: 'End of the path') in 1908 when a post office was established in the town. The area was originally a Māori hunting trail, hence the name.

References

Buller District
Populated places in the West Coast, New Zealand